The Journal of the Southwest is a quarterly peer-reviewed academic journal published quarterly by the Southwest Center, at the University of Arizona, with a focus on the American Southwest and adjacent northwestern Mexico. The journal publishes scholarly research papers and reviews from across a range of academic fields in the humanities, including anthropology, folklore, literary studies, historiography, socio-political studies and aspects of the region's natural history.

As an area studies journal, the Journal of the Southwest is intended as an interdisciplinary research resource in the study of the region's peoples and cultures.

The journal was initially established in 1959 as a periodical sponsored by the University of Arizona, under the name Arizona and the West. In 1987 the journal's  name was changed to the current Journal of the Southwest, with the volume numbering carried over under the new name and format.

External links 
 Journal of the Southwest at The University of Arizona, Tucson

Publications established in 1959
University of Arizona
Area studies journals
English-language journals
Quarterly journals